"So Easy" is a song by Norwegian duo Röyksopp, released as their first single. It was first made available in 1999, with only 500 copies made and distributed. It was later re-released on Röyksopp's debut album Melody A.M. "So Easy" contains instrumental and vocal samples from a 1960s cover version of the Burt Bacharach/Hal David song "Blue on Blue" recorded by a Swedish vocal group called Gals and Pals. The sampled lyrics are "Blue on blue, heartache on heartache/Blue on blue, Now that we are through."

"So Easy" was used in displays between programs on Nickelodeon UK and Channel 4, as well as in British television adverts for T-Mobile (now EE). After the song was featured in these commercials, the single was re-released, with the group's hit "Remind Me" as the A-side and "So Easy" as the B-side.

Thorbjørn Brundtland commented on the song "With regard to all the positive reactions So Easy has received, one can wonder if we really have talent, or if it is just luck."

Track listings

Original release
 "So Easy" – 3:44
 "The 64-Position" – 1:25
 "Fusion's Allright" – 6:39

Re-release
 "Remind Me" (Someone Else's Radio Remix) – 4:03
 "So Easy" – 3:44
 "Remind Me" (James Zabiela's Ingeborg Mix) – 8:35

Charts

References

1999 singles
Röyksopp songs
1999 songs
Songs written by Svein Berge
Songs written by Torbjørn Brundtland